Gina Dent is an associate professor of Feminist Studies at UC Santa Cruz. She is associate dean of diversity, equity, and inclusion for the Humanities Division at UC Santa Cruz. She co authored the 2022 book Abolition. Feminism. Now. with her partner, Angela Davis; Erica Meiners, and Beth Richie.

Education 
Dent received her B. A. in Comparative Literature from the University of California, Berkeley, and her M.A.and Ph.D. in English & Comparative Literature from Columbia University.

Career 
Dent is currently an associate professor of feminist studies, history of consciousness, and legal studies in the humanities division at the University of California, Santa Cruz. In 2019, she received a Dizikes Award for teaching.

Her research interests include Africana studies, legal theory, and popular culture. She is the editor of Black Popular Culture (1992). This collection was named a Village Voice Best Book of the Year. In 2011, Dent served in a delegation to Palestine, and she advocates for human rights in the region. She is sought-after internationally as a speaker and educator on Black Feminism and abolitionism. 

She has two forthcoming books, Prison as a Border and Other Essays, and Anchored to the Real: Black Literature in the Wake of Anthropology, which will be published by Duke University Press. Dent co authored the 2022 book Abolition. Feminism. Now. with Angela Davis, Erica Meiners, and Beth Richie, which argues for a prison abolitionist vision of feminism.

Personal life 
As of 2020, Dent was living with her partner, feminist scholar and activist Angela Y. Davis. Together, they have advocated for the abolition of police and prisons, using the concept of abolition feminism.

Bibliography 

 Editor, Black Popular Culture. Seattle: Bay Press, 1992; New York: New Press, 1999.  
 “Michael Joo,” in Elaine Kim and Margo Machida, eds., Fresh Talk/Daring Gazes: Asian American Issues in the Contemporary Visual Arts. Berkeley: University of California Press. 2003
 Co-author with mentor Angela Y. Davis, “Prison as a Border: A Conversation on Gender, Globalization and Punishment,” Signs: Journal of Women and Culture, Vol. 26 No. 4; Summer, 2001.
 “A New York Story,” catalogue essay for the exhibition Inclusion/Exclusion. Graz, Austria. 1997.
 Jack Salzman, David Lionel Smith, and Cornel West, (eds) “Rita Dove” and “Jamaica Kincaid” (literary biographies) in Encyclopedia of African American Culture and History, New York: Macmillan Library Reference. 1996.
 “Missionary Position” in Rebecca Walker, ed., To Be Real: Telling the Truth and Changing the Face of Feminism. New York: Anchor/Doubleday. 1995.
 “Race and Racism: A Symposium,” Social Text. Vol. 42. Spring, 1995

References 

Living people
American feminists
Year of birth missing (living people)
Place of birth missing (living people)
University of California, Berkeley alumni
Columbia Graduate School of Arts and Sciences alumni
Feminist studies scholars
University of California, Santa Cruz faculty
African-American social scientists
American women social scientists
LGBT African Americans
21st-century African-American people
21st-century African-American women
 Prison abolitionists